Dashu is a town under the administration of Chun'an County, Zhejiang, China. , it has 17 villages under its administration.

References 

Towns of Zhejiang
Chun'an County